Tondguyan Expressway is an expressway in Tehran from Besat Square in southeastern corner of Tehran Railway Station to Azadegan Expressway and Behesht-e Zahra Expressway.

Expressways in Tehran
Expressways in Iran